John Hamilton FitzMaurice, Viscount Kirkwall (9 October 1778 – 23 November 1820), known as John FitzMaurice until 1791, was a British politician.

Background
Kirkwall was the son of the Hon. Thomas FitzMaurice, younger son of John Petty, 1st Earl of Shelburne. His mother was Mary, suo jure Countess of Orkney, daughter of Murrough O'Brien, 1st Marquess of Thomond and Mary, suo jure Countess of Orkney.  His father was the Thomas FitzMaurice,  5th Earl of Orkney.  The Prime Minister of Great Britain, Lord Shelburne,  William Petty FitzMaurice, was his uncle. He gained the courtesy title Viscount Kirkwall when his mother succeeded as Countess of Orkney in 1791.

Political career
Kirkwall was returned to Parliament for Heytesbury in 1802, a seat he held until 1806, and later represented Denbigh Boroughs between 1812 and 1818.

Family
Lord Kirkwall married the Hon. Anna Maria, daughter of John Blaquiere, 1st Baron de Blaquiere, in 1802. He died in November 1820, aged 42, predeceasing his mother by eleven years. His eldest son Thomas later succeeded in the earldom. His second son the Hon. William was a politician. Lady Kirkwall died in January 1843.

See also
Marquess of Lansdowne
Earl of Orkney

References

External links
 

1778 births
1820 deaths
Members of the Parliament of the United Kingdom for English constituencies
UK MPs 1802–1806
Members of the Parliament of the United Kingdom for Welsh constituencies
UK MPs 1812–1818
Heirs apparent who never acceded
British courtesy viscounts
John
Fellows of the Royal Society